The Bangor and Aroostook Railroad (BAR) of northern Maine was at the northeastern tip of the United States rail network. Its location offered no bridge traffic between other railways, but required dependable service when winter weather made transportation difficult.  Potato loadings peaked during winter months, and a fleet of ten-wheelers built by Manchester Locomotive Works provided reliable service through the early 20th century. Consolidations for the heavier winter freight service were built at other American Locomotive Company (ALCO) plants. Potato traffic remained relatively constant through the great depression, and declining bridge traffic revenues which brought insolvency to other railroads were irrelevant to BAR. BAR provided reliable paychecks attracting competent maintenance personnel, and continued to replace older engines with modern steam locomotives through 1945. As less fortunate railroads began replacing their worn-out steam power with modern diesel locomotives, BAR initially purchased a number of used modern steam locomotives from railroads converting to diesel power.

Steam locomotives

Diesel locomotives 
After ALCO's Black Maria demonstrator failed to meet expectations while testing on the BAR, the company purchased Electro-Motive Diesel (EMD) E7As for passenger service, NW2 yard switchers, F3A-B-A multiple units for heavy freight service, and unusual BL2s for branch line freight service in the late 1940s. After observing their performance, BAR sold the F3B units and purchased more flexible EMD GP7s for regular service. Steam locomotives were initially retained to meet the peak winter freight loads; but these were replaced by EMD GP9s seasonally leased to the Pennsylvania Railroad to handle summer ore traffic from the Great Lakes. BAR purchased the first EMD GP38s to replace its least satisfactory first-generation diesels prior to loss of the potato shipping business. Subsequent sale of their refrigerator car fleet idled the mechanical refrigeration maintenance shop force until BAR began purchasing and rebuilding used locomotives. Rebuilt locomotives were leased or sold to other railroads, and the rebuilding efforts preserved several earlier models for subsequent purchase by museums and heritage railways.

References 

Bangor and Aroostook Railroad